Geoffrey Hornby (1825–1895) was a British Royal Navy Admiral of the Fleet. Admiral Hornby may also refer to:

Phipps Hornby (1785–1867), British Royal Navy admiral
Robert Hornby (1866–1956), British Royal Navy admiral